The End may refer to:

Films
 The End (1953 film), a film by Christopher Maclaine
 The End (1978 film), a comedy by Burt Reynolds
 The End (1997 film), a Canadian film of 1997
 The End (1998 film), a skateboarding documentary
 The End, a 1998 short by Joe Wright
 The End (2004 film), an American film by Kirby Dick
 The End (2004 Indian film), a Tollywood film that received the Sarojini Devi Award for a Film on National Integration
 The End (2007 Hungarian film), a Hungarian film
 The End (2007 Canadian film)
 The End (2008 film), a Spanish short starring Samuel Roukin
 The End, a 2011 short film starring Angelica Mandy
 The End (2012 film), a Spanish thriller
 The End (2013 film), a film starring Sivan Levy
 The End (2016 film), a French film
 The End?, 2017 Italian film

Literature
 The End (comics), a series published by Marvel Comics
 The End (novel), a A Series of Unfortunate Events novel by Lemony Snicket
 The End: Hitler's Germany 1944–45, a 2011 book by Ian Kershaw
 "The End" (poem), a poem by Wilfred Owen
 "The End" (story), a 1953 short story by Jorge Luis Borges in Ficciones
 The End, a novel in the series My Struggle by Karl Ove Knausgård

Games
 The End (video game), a 1980 video game
 The End (role-playing game), a 1995 post-Armageddon role-playing game 
 The End (Metal Gear), a character from Metal Gear Solid 3: Snake Eater
 The End, an alternate dimension in Minecraft
 The End, two live events in Fortnite: Battle Royale
 The End, an antagonist in Sonic Frontiers

Music
 The End Records, an American independent record label
 The End Tour, a 2016 Black Sabbath tour

Bands
 The End (UK band), a 1960s British psychedelic-pop band
 The End (Canadian band), a mathcore band
 The End Band, an Austrian indie pop band

Albums
 The E.N.D., a 2009 album by Black Eyed Peas
 The End (EP), a 2016 EP by Black Sabbath
 The End (Crack the Sky album) (1984)
 The End (Forever in Terror album) (2009)
 The End (Melvins album) (2008)
 The End (Mika Nakashima album) (2006)
 The End..., a 1974 album by Nico 
 Chapter 1: The End, a 1997 album by Three 6 Mafia
 The End, a 2021 album by Aina the End
 The End, a 2011 album by Gallhammer
 The End, a 1999 album by Spectre

Songs
 "The End" (Beatles song) (1969)
 "The End" (The Doors song) (1967)
 "The End" (Earl Grant song) (1958)
 "The End" (Groove Coverage song) (2004)
 "The End", a song by Ryan Adams from Jacksonville City Nights
 "The End", a song by Andrew F from Reckless Abandon
 "The End", a song by Attila from Rage
 "The End", a song by Behemoth from Thelema.6
 "The End", a song by Bullet for My Valentine from The Poison
 "The End", a song by The Classic Crime from The Silver Cord
 "The End", a song by Cryptopsy from Once Was Not
 "The End", a song by Demon Hunter from Outlive
 "The End", a song by Dirty South
 "The End", a song by Discharge from Hear Nothing See Nothing Say Nothing
 "The End", a song by Feeder from Renegades
 "The End", a song by Fitz and the Tantrums from More Than Just a Dream
 "The End", a song by Ellie Goulding from Bright Lights
 "The End", a song by Iced Earth from Plagues of Babylon
 "The End", a song by Ken Carson from X
 "The End", a song by Kid Cudi from Man on the Moon II: The Legend of Mr. Rager
 "The End", a song by Kings of Leon from Come Around Sundown
 "The End", a song by Laleh from Me and Simon
 "The End", a song by Little Mix from Get Weird
 "The End", a song by Mayday Parade from Anywhere but Here
 "The End", a song by McFly from Radio:Active
 "The End", a song by Mr. Oizo from Moustache (Half a Scissor)
 "The End", a song by My Chemical Romance from The Black Parade
 "The End", a song by Pearl Jam from Backspacer
 "The End", a song by Saves the Day from Sound the Alarm
 "The End", a song by Silverstein from A Shipwreck in the Sand
 "The End", a song by Simple Plan from Simple Plan
 "The End", a song by Derek Webb from The Ringing Bell
 "The End", a song by While She Sleeps from Sleeps Society
 "The End", by C418 from Minecraft - Volume Beta, 2013
 "The End", a mashup by Neil Cicierega from Mouth Moods

Radio stations
 KZND-FM (94.7 The End), Anchorage, Alaska
 KUDL (106.5 The End), Sacramento, California
 KDND, a former radio station in Sacramento, California at 107.9 that also carried "The End" branding from 1998 to 2017.
 WEND (106.5 The End), Charlotte, North Carolina
 KHTB (formerly KENZ, 101.9 The End), Salt Lake City, Utah
 KNDD (107.7 The End), Seattle, Washington

Television
 The End (Australian TV series), a 2020 drama series
 The End (Egyptian TV series), a 2020 science fiction series
 The End (Irish TV programme), a 1993–1996 comedy programme
 NXT TakeOver: The End, a 2016 professional wrestling show and WWE Network event

Episodes
 "The End" (Absolutely Fabulous)
 "The End" (The Amazing World of Gumball)
 "The End" (American Horror Story)
 "The End" (Curb Your Enthusiasm)
 "The End" (The Goodies)
 "The End" (Grimm)
 "The End" (Lost)
 "The End" (Red Dwarf)
 "The End" (Supernatural)
 "The End" (Teen Titans)
 "The End" (The X-Files)

Other uses
 The End (club), a former nightclub in the West End of London
 The End, a Ty Beanie Baby bear that was believed to signal the retirement of all Beanies

See also

 End (disambiguation)
 End of the world (disambiguation)
 Game over
 In the End (disambiguation)
 This Is the End, a 2013 American comedy film